Landprints may refer to:

 Landprints, a book by Walter S. Sullivan
 Landprints: Reflections on Place and Landscape, a book by George Seddon